Wildflower Creek is a stream in St. Louis County, Missouri in the U.S. state of Missouri.

Wildflower Creek was named for the wildflowers which abounded there.

References

Rivers of Missouri
Rivers of St. Louis County, Missouri